Vinay Apte (17 June 1951 – 7 December 2013) was an Indian film and television actor. He acted in several Marathi movies and television shows in his almost 40-year-old career. He has also acted in Hindi movies such as Chandni Bar, Ek Chalis Ki Last Local, It's Breaking News, Satyagraha and Rajneeti.

Apart from acting he was associated with a production house. He died in Mumbai on 7 December 2013.

Apte began his acting career in 1974 in Marathi theatre and gradually began directing Marathi plays. His first play Mitrachi Goshta (Friend's Story) was written by well known Marathi playwright Vijay Tendulkar. Me Nathuram Godse Boltoy, a play directed by Vinay Apte, had been the target of heavy political controversy. He appeared in several TV serials such as Lajja and Eka lagnachi dusri goshta. He also appeared in several Bollywood films like Dhamaal, Aarakshan, Gangajal and Rajneeti. He was one of the leading actors in Marathi cinema, dramas and serials.

Filmography

Aakrosh (1980)
Kalyug (1981) - Mhatre
Gandhi (1982) - Hindu Youth in Calcutta street #2
Bombay War (1990)
In India Today (1991)
Nishpaap (1992) - Anna Khalbhor
Hach Sunbaicha Bahu (1992) - Malharrao Kolshe
Ladhaai (1999) - Dr. S.M Shinde
Chandni Bar (2001) - Inspector Gaikwad
Saathiya (2002) - Senior inspector
Kyon? (2003) - DSP Manohar Shinde
Police Force: An Inside Story (2004) - Sawant
Khabardaar (2005)
Corporate (2006) - State Finance Minister Gulabrao Ingle
Aai Shappath..! (2006) - Devki's father-in-law
Karz Kunkavache (2007)
Brinda (2007)
Ek Chalis Ki Last Local (2007) - Ponnappa
Dhamaal (2007) - Prabhakarn Shriperavardhana Attapatu Jaisurya Laxman Shivramkrishna Shivavenkata Rajashekhar Shrinivasan Trichapally Ikaparam Pila Perambdur Chinnaswami Muthuswami Vengopal Iyer
It's Breaking News (2007) - DIG Dandekar
Vignharta Shri Siddhi Vinayak (2007)
Checkmate (2008) - Sampatrao Mahabal
Pranali: The Tradition (2008) - Keshav Prasad
Dashavatar (2008) - Kansa
C Kkompany (2008) - Inspector Jawle
Foreign Chi Patlin (2008) - Sarpanch Balwantrao Patil (Tatya)
Madhu Ithe Choughe Tithe (2008)
Agnihotra (2009, TV Series) - Sadanand Rao
Ek Da Kaay Zale Baiko Udali Bhurrr (2009)
Nishani Dava Angatha (2009)
Jogwa (2009) - Basappa
Veer (2010) - Nanku
Lalbaug Parel (2010) - Speedbreakers Father
City of Gold - Mumbai 1982: Ek Ankahee Kahani (2010) - Govind Rahate
Ranbhool (2010)
Raajneeti (2010) - Babulal
Sa Sasucha (2010) - Kartik's Father
Target (2010) - Vishwasrao
Paradh (2010) - Prataprao
Mohaan Aawatey (2011) - Aamdar
Taryanche Bait (2011) 
Aarakshan (2011) - Neta Bhishamber
Arjun (2011) - Jay Thackray
Hello JaiHind (2011)
Adaalat (2011-2012, TV Series) - Meghraj Rane
Eka Lagnachi Dusri Goshta (2012, Marathi Serial) - Mahesh Desai
Yedyanchi Jatra (2012)
Dhagedore (2012) - Advocate Bhalerao
Badam Rani Gulam Chor (2012) - Politician
Chakravyuh (2012) - Krishna Raj
Bokad (2012)
Mazha Mee (2013)
Dham Dhoom (2013)
Madhubala – Ek Ishq Ek Junoon (2014, TV Series) - Shivdutt Marathe
Gulabi (2014) - Minister
Gour Hari Dastaan (2015) - MLA Olwe
Dhol Taashe (2015) - Deshmukh
Aawahan (2015) - Chief Minister
Shasan (2016) - Anand Rao
Dhondi (2017) - Patil
total dhamaal (2018) - Patil

TV serials 
 Lajja
 Manus
 Avantika
 Anamika
 Asmita
 Parijaat
 Agnihotra
 Bhagyalaxmi
 Laxman Resha
 Kya Baat Hai
 Gharaounda
 Ya Sukhano Ya
 Bolachi Kadhi
 Raat Chanderi
 Bhagya Vidhata
 Girid Interpol
 Mungeri Ke Bhai Naurangi Laal – Hindi
 Abhalmaya
 Eka Lagnachi Dusri Goshta
 Durva
 Vahinisaheb

Plays
 Mee Nathuram Godse Boltoy – Director
 Mitrachi Goshta
 Just Another Rape – English
 Carry On Heaven – English
 Kamala – English
 Kabaddi Kabaddi

References

External links

Indian male television actors
Indian male film actors
1951 births
2013 deaths